Hester Christina Potgieter (born 15 October 1992), known as Christi Potgieter, is a South African former professional tennis player. Her married name is Slabbert.

Born in Bloemfontein, Potgieter was raised on a farm near Petrusville, Northern Cape. She attended Eunice High School in Bloemfontein and played collegiate tennis for Texas A&M. Competing briefly in professional tennis, she attained best rankings of 632 for singles and 410 for doubles. In 2010 she was a member of the South Africa Fed Cup team, winning one singles and two doubles rubbers. Her sister Elzé has also played Fed Cup tennis for South Africa.

ITF finals

Doubles: 2 (2–0)

See also
List of South Africa Fed Cup team representatives

References

External links
 

1992 births
Living people
South African female tennis players
Texas A&M Aggies women's tennis players
Sportspeople from the Northern Cape